Rebrovo is a rural locality (a village) in Fominskoye Rural Settlement, Gorokhovetsky District, Vladimir Oblast, Russia. The population was 43 as of 2010.

Geography 
Rebrovo is located 43 km southwest of Gorokhovets (the district's administrative centre) by road. Rassvet is the nearest rural locality.

References 

Rural localities in Gorokhovetsky District